Kolhapuri saaj is necklace named after Kolhapur, a city in Maharashtra, India.

Design and construction
Traditionally the necklace is made of 21 leaves or pendants but contemporary wearers prefer 10 to 12. Customarily the necklace is handmade, taking a person a week to make, however challenges such as shortage of skilled manpower and its high cost have prompted the attempt to mechanise its production.

Trisha Bhattacharya in a Deccan Herald article describes the design thus:...(The) 21 design-portions mostly, comprise avatars of Vishnu, and symbols of ashtmangal. The Kolhapuri saaj begins with chaphe-kali (frangipani buds), and ends with kirti mukh (a good luck charm). In line are panch panadi (holy leaves), bel leaf (leaf offered to Lord Shiva), bel plant (a plant of three united leaves), ridge gourd (symbolic of all plants), karle or Bitter gourd (life-giving herb), Sun, manik panadi (a gem, symbolising friendship), matsya (fish, or incarnation of Vishnu), Koorma (incarnation of Vishnu), Narasimha (incarnation of Vishnu), rose, beetle, chandra (Moon), emerald, gandbhairi (symbolising unity of husband and wife), morchel (symbolic of kingdom and richness), peacock feather, shankha (Conch), wagh nakhe (tiger nail, symbolising power of weapons), and snake (symbolising union). Other symbols that are used could also be kamal (lotus), kasav (tortoise) and bhunga (bumble bee). The Kolhapuri saaj is woven into green colour silk, and further ornamentation is done.

References 

Kolhapur
Jewellery of India